František Lydie Gahura (10 October 1891 in Zlín – 15 September 1958 in Brno) was a Czeochslovak architect and sculptor.

Career
Gahura became famous for his collaboration on the architectural and urban design of the Czech city of Zlín. He worked for the Bata Shoes organization in the 1920s and 1930s. Gahura was one of a number of Czech architects to design the "Bata houses" and Bata shoe factory at East Tilbury, Essex, England. The most impressive architectural work of František Lydie Gahura is Tomas Bata Memorial. The building process started in 1932 and the monument was open with ceremony on the day of the first anniversary of Tomáš Baťa death that is on 12 July 1933. It is the most valuable building of the Zlín functionalism.

Works
 City Hall, Zlín (1923)
 Baťa Hospital, Zlín (1926-1930)
 Church of Saint Anthony of Padua, Míškovice (1922–1927)
 Chapel of Saint Wenceslaus, Kudlov (1927)
 J. A. Baťa Villa, Zlín (1927)
 Masaryk Schools, Zlín (1927-1928)
 Baťa Service House, Prague (1928-1929)
 Forest cemetery, Zlín (1931)
 Department store, Zlín (1931)
 Grand Cinema, Zlín (1931)
 Tomas Bata Memorial, Zlín (1933)

Gallery

References

Czechoslovak architects
Czechoslovak urban planners
Czechoslovak sculptors
1891 births
1958 deaths
People from Zlín
Modernist architects